Cyclandelate is a vasodilator used in the treatment of claudication, arteriosclerosis and Raynaud's disease.  It is also used to treat nighttime leg cramps, and has been investigated for its effect against migraine.  It is orally administered.

References

Acetate esters
Secondary alcohols
3,3,5-Trimethylcyclohexyl esters